The 1974 African Men's Handball Championship was the first edition of the African Men's Handball Championship, which took place in 1974, in Tunis, Tunisia. The host Tunisia won the tournament.

Note that a women's tournament of the African Women's Handball Championship is organized in parallel.

Qualified teams

Venue
El Menzah Sports Palace, Tunis

Final standing

References

African handball championships
Handball
A
Handball
Handball in Tunisia